Bel-Air is an American drama television series developed by Morgan Cooper, Malcolm Spellman, TJ Brady, and Rasheed Newson. It is a reimagined version of the sitcom The Fresh Prince of Bel-Air and is based on Cooper's short fan film of the same name. It stars Jabari Banks, Adrian Holmes, Cassandra Freeman, Olly Sholotan, Coco Jones, Akira Akbar, Jimmy Akingbola, Jordan L. Jones, and Simone Joy Jones. The series premiered on Peacock on February 13, 2022.  The second season was released on February 23, 2023. In March 2023, the series was renewed for a third season.

Premise
The series follows Will Smith's complicated journey from the streets of West Philadelphia to the gated mansions of Bel-Air. It dives deep into racial tension, culture shock, and black excellence.

Cast and characters

Main

 Jabari Banks as Will Smith, a 16-year-old from West Philadelphia who is sent to live with his aunt and uncle in Bel-Air by his mother, Vy
 Cassandra Freeman as Vivian Banks, Will's aunt, wife of Philip, mother of Hilary, Carlton and Ashley and sister of Vy
 Jimmy Akingbola as Geoffrey Thompson, the House Manager of the Bankses, originally from Jamaica before moving to London as a child
 Olly Sholotan as Carlton Banks, the lacrosse-playing middle child of Viv and Phil and Will's cousin and adversary
 Coco Jones as Hilary Banks, a social media influencer, excellent chef and eldest child of Viv and Phil and Will's cousin
 Akira Akbar as Ashley Banks, the 12-year-old youngest child of Viv and Phil and Will's cousin
 Simone Joy Jones as Lisa Wilkes, a potential love interest of Will, and Carlton's ex. She is also on the swim team.
 Jordan L. Jones as Jazz, a taxi driver Will met and bonded with when he arrived at LAX. He also owns a record store and has a crush on Hilary.
 Adrian Holmes as Philip Banks, Will's lawyer uncle, husband of Viv and father of Hilary, Carlton and Ashley

Recurring

 April Parker Jones as Viola 'Vy' Smith, Will's mother
 SteVonté Hart as Tray Melbert, Will's former best friend in Philadelphia
 Tyler Barnhardt as Connor Satterfield, Carlton's best friend
 Joe Holt as Fred Wilkes, Lisa's father who is a Chief of Police for the LAPD
 Charlie Hall as Tyler Laramy, Will's friend and basketball teammate at Bel-Air Academy
 Jon Beavers as Kylo
 Michael Ealy as Reed Broderick

 Karrueche Tran as Ivy

 Riele Downs as Yazmin (season 2)

Special guest stars
 Daphne Maxwell Reid as Helen, a board member of the Art Council. Reid previously was the second actress to portray Vivian Banks in the original series.
 Vernee Watson-Johnson as Janice, another board member of the Art Council. Watson-Johnson previously portrayed Viola 'Vy' Smith in the original series.
 Marlon Wayans as Lou, Will's father whom he thought abandoned  his mother and him
 Tatyana Ali as Mrs. Hughes (season 2), Ashley's English literature teacher at Bel-Air Academy. Ali portrayed "Ashley Banks" in the original series.

Episodes

Series overview

Season 1 (2022)

Season 2 (2023)

Production

Development
On March 10, 2019, Morgan Cooper uploaded Bel-Air to YouTube. The submission was a fan film, written and directed by him, in the form of a mock trailer for an updated and dramatic reimagining of the television sitcom The Fresh Prince of Bel-Air. Will Smith, who starred in the original sitcom as a fictionalized version of himself, heavily praised the fan film and expressed his interest in expanding the concept into a reboot, personally meeting with Cooper. On August 11, 2020, the series was officially announced after being in the works for over a year. At the time, Netflix, HBO Max, and Peacock were bidding for the rights to the series. On September 8, 2020, Peacock gave the series a two-season order under the title Bel-Air, with Westbrook Inc. and Universal Television producing. Smith and Cooper executive produce alongside Terence Carter, James Lassiter, Miguel Melendez, Malcolm Spellman, Quincy Jones, Benny Medina, Andy Borowitz, and Susan Borowitz. Upon the streaming records announcement, it was reported that Anthony Sparks joined the series as an executive producer for the second season. On October 13, 2022, it was announced that Carla Banks Waddles has been promoted to executive producer and showrunner for the second season, replacing TJ Brady & Rasheed Newson who were the showrunners for the first season. Banks Waddles was a co-executive producer for the first season. On March 17, 2023, Peacock renewed the series for a third season.

Casting 
In August 2021, Smith surprised Jabari Banks with the news that Banks would star as the lead. In September 2021, Adrian Holmes, Cassandra Freeman, Olly Sholotan, Coco Jones, Akira Akbar, Jimmy Akingbola, Jordan L. Jones, and Simone Joy Jones joined the cast as series regulars. In January 2022, Karrueche Tran, Duane Martin, Joe Holt, April Parker Jones, SteVonté Hart, Scottie Thompson, and Charlie Hall in recurring roles. In March 2022, it was reported that Daphne Maxwell Reid and Vernee Watson-Johnson guest starred in episode 9 on March 24. On January 12, 2023, it was announced that Saweetie is set to make a cameo appearance as herself while Brooklyn McLinn, Jazlyn Martin, and Riele Downs were cast in recurring capacities for the second season. A week later, it was reported that Tatyana Ali who played Ashley Banks in The Fresh Prince of Bel Air was cast in a recurring role for the second season. On February 21, 2023, Al-Shabazz Jabateh, Nicholas Duvernay, Diandra Lyle, Justin Cornwell, and Reno Wilson joined the cast in recurring capacities for the second season.

Filming 
Principal photography was scheduled to take place in Los Angeles and Philadelphia. On January 7, 2022, it was reported that the series had some positive COVID-19 tests on set, but production was not impacted.

Release
An online premiere for the series was held on February 9, 2022, by Crown & Conquer. The series premiered on Peacock on February 13, 2022, with its first three episodes. The second season premiered on February 23, 2023.

Reception

Critical response
On the review aggregator website Rotten Tomatoes, the first season holds an approval rating of 66% based 47 critic reviews, with an average rating on 6.2/10. The website's critics consensus reads, "Bel-Air replaces its predecessor's high spirits with a dour tone and an uneasy mix of realism, although there are signs that this reimagining can grow into a fresh new spin." Metacritic, which uses a weighted average, assigned a score of 59 out of 100 based on 25 critics, indicating "mixed or average reviews". 

The second season has a 90% approval rating on Rotten Tomatoes, based on 10 critic reviews, with an average rating of 6.7/10. On Metacritic, the second season received a score of 71 based on reviews from 4 critics, indicating "generally favorable reviews. 

On May 2, 2022, Peacock announced that Bel-Air is the most-streamed original series on the streaming service in which the series reached 8 million accounts to date.

Accolades

References

External links
 
 

2020s American black television series
2020s American drama television series
2022 American television series debuts
English-language television shows
Live action television shows based on films
Metafictional television series
Peacock (streaming service) original programming
Television series about families
Television series about teenagers
Television series by Universal Television
Television series reboots
Television shows set in Los Angeles
Television shows set in Philadelphia
The Fresh Prince of Bel-Air
Works by Malcolm Spellman
2020s American LGBT-related television series
2020s American LGBT-related drama television series
2020s LGBT-related television series